Joseph Nyamihana Mulenga (died 29 August 2012) was an Ugandan judge. He served as Justice of the Supreme Court of Uganda for twelve years between 1997 and 2009, and was a judge and later President of the East African Court of Justice. Mulenga died in August 2012.

Biography
Mulenga obtained a Bachelor of Laws from the University of London in 1965. He was called to the bar at Middle Temple the next year.

During fourteen years Mulenga was National Deputy Chairman of the Democratic Party of Uganda.

In the years between 1986 and 1989 he was Minister of Justice and Attorney General, he later was Minister for Regional Co-operation. In 1997 he became a member of the Supreme Court of Uganda where he would serve for twelve years. He also became a judge of the East African Court of Justice where he would become President.

He later started working on a part-time basis for the African Court on Human and Peoples' Rights. He died on 29 August 2012.

References

Year of birth missing
2012 deaths
Alumni of the University of London
Democratic Party (Uganda) politicians
Judges of the African Court on Human and Peoples' Rights
Justices of the Supreme Court of Uganda
Attorneys General of Uganda
East African Court of Justice judges
Ugandan judges of international courts and tribunals